Walking the Dog is the debut studio album by American R&B singer Rufus Thomas from Memphis, Tennessee. It was released in 1963 through Stax Records with distribution by Atlantic. The album peaked at number 138 on the Billboard 200 albums chart in the United States. It spawned three hit singles: "The Dog", "Walking the Dog" and "Can Your Monkey Do the Dog", which made it to the Billboard Hot 100 singles chart at No. 87, No. 10 and No. 48 respectively.

Track listing

Chart history

References

External links 

1963 debut albums
Rufus Thomas albums
Albums produced by Jim Stewart (record producer)
Stax Records albums